Vishka Varzal (also Romanized as Vīshkā Varzal; also known as Vīshgāh, Vīshkā, Vyshika, and Wīshgāh) is a village in Lakan Rural District, in the Central District of Rasht County, Gilan Province, Iran. At the 2006 census, its population was 174, in 47 families.

References 

Populated places in Rasht County